Cape Meredith (Argentine name "Cabo Belgrano") is the southernmost point of West Falkland in the Falkland Islands.

There is a shanty in the area, which is a listed building.

References

Peninsulas of the Falkland Islands
Headlands of West Falkland